Pierre Alféri (born 1963) is a French novelist, poet, and essayist. Alféri is the son of the French philosopher Jacques Derrida and psychoanalyst Marguerite Aucouturier.

Career
After his dissertation on William of Ockham, Alféri began to primarily write poetry. Alféri is also a literary translator who has translated works by John Donne, Giorgio Agamben and Meyer Schapiro from English and Russian into French. He has also written songs for several performing artists including Jeanne Balibar. Between 1991 and 1992, Alféri was writer-in-residence at the Fondation Royaumont, and at the French Academy in Rome between 1987 and 1988.

Alféri is co-founder (with Suzanne Doppelt), of the literary journal Détail, and La Revue de Littérature Générale (with Olivier Cadiot). Alféri teaches at the École nationale supérieure des beaux-arts in Paris, the École nationale supérieure des arts décoratifs in Paris, and the European Graduate School.

Publications 
Poetry
 Les Allures naturelles POL, Paris, 1991 
 Le Chemin familier du poisson combatif, POL, Paris, 1992 
 Kub Or, POL, Paris, 1994 
 Sentimentale journée, POL, Paris, 1997 
 Personal Pong (avec Jacques Julien), Villa Saint-Clair, Sète, 1997
 Handicap (avec Jacques Julien), Rroz, 2000
 petit, petit, Rup et rud, 2001
 La Voie des airs, POL, Paris, 2004 
 OXO (photos by Suzanne Doppelt, trans. by Cole Swensen), Burning Deck, Providence, 2004 
 Writing the Real: A Bilingual Anthology of Contemporary French Poetry (translated by Kate Lermitte Campbell), 2016. Enitharmon Press

Novels
 Fmn, POL, Paris, 1994 
 Le Cinéma des familles, POL, Paris, 1999 
 Les Jumelles, POL, Paris, 2009 
 Après vous, POL, Paris, 2010 

Essays
Guillaume d'Ockham le singulier, Minuit, coll. « Philosophie », Paris, 1989 
Chercher une phrase, Christian Bourgois, coll. « Détroits », Paris, 1991 
 Des enfants et des monstres, POL, Paris, 2004 

Art
 Ca Commence à Séoul, DVD video. Pierre Alféri and Jacques Julien, Le Label Dernière Bande and Éditions P.O.L. 2007
 L'inconnu, Pierre Alféri and Jacques Julien, le Quartier - Centre d'art contemporain de Quimper. 2004

References

External links
 Pierre Alferi at École Nationale Supérieure des Beaux-Arts
 Pierre Alferi. University of California, Berkeley. 2009 Regents' Lecturer.

1963 births
Living people
Writers from Paris
20th-century French poets
French art critics
Academic staff of European Graduate School
21st-century French poets
21st-century French male writers
20th-century French translators
21st-century translators
French male poets
20th-century French male writers
French male non-fiction writers
20th-century French Jews
Jewish poets